Tant d'amour perdu (Le insaziabili) is a 1958 French-Italian film. It stars Pierre Fresnay and Gabriele Ferzetti.

Cats
Pierre Fresnay: Joseph Andrieu
Franca Bettoia: Annie
Anne Doat: Christine
Gabriele Ferzetti: Frédéric Solingen
Claude Titre: Michel Mortier
Michel Bardinet: Lionel de Bellac
Marguerite Pierry: Léocadie
The Bernard Jarrige: The Undertaker
René Bergeron: Martin

References

External links

1958 films
Italian comedy-drama films
1950s Italian-language films
Films with screenplays by Roland Laudenbach
1950s Italian films